Shanklin is a seaside resort and civil parish on the Isle of Wight, England.

Shanklin may also refer to:

 Shanklin Chine, a wooded coastal ravine containing waterfalls, trees and lush vegetation, with footpaths and walkways allowing paid access for visitors, and a heritage centre explaining its history.
 Shanklin Estate, council housing estate in Sutton, South London; sited between Brighton Road and the Epsom Downs Branch
 Shanklin Family, American family involved in politics and government
 Shanklin Glacier, a glacier in the Hughes Range of Antarctica, flowing southeast from Mount Waterman to enter Muck Glacier at a point 8 km (5 mi) west of Ramsey Glacier
 Shanklin railway station, the railway station in the civil parish of Shanklin on the Isle of Wight
 Ron Shanklin, American football player